Chase David Burns (born January 16, 2003) is an American college baseball pitcher for the Tennessee Volunteers.

Amateur career
Burns grew up in Gallatin, Tennessee and initially attended Station Camp High School. He transferred Beech Senior High School
before the start of his senior year. Burns was selected in the 20th round of the 2021 Major League Baseball draft by the San Diego Padres, but did not sign with the team.

Burns entered his freshman season at Tennessee as a member of the Volunteers' starting rotation. He finished the season with a 8-2 record and 2.91 ERA with 103  strikeouts in  innings pitched. Burns was named the Freshman Pitcher of the Year by the National Collegiate Baseball Writers Association at the end of the season.

References

External links

Tennessee Volunteers bio

Living people
Baseball players from Tennessee
Baseball pitchers
Tennessee Volunteers baseball players
Year of birth missing (living people)